Altice USA (formerly Cablevision) is an American cable television operator with systems in the states of Connecticut, New York, New Jersey, Pennsylvania.

Cablevision may also refer to:
Cablevisión (Argentina), an Argentine cable television operator, owned by Clarín group
Cablevision (Canada), a Canadian cable television operator in the province of Quebec and parts of Ontario
CableVision (Green Bay, Wisconsin), a cable television operator that operated out of Green Bay, Wisconsin, United States from the 1980s to the mid-1990s.
Cablevision (Lebanon), a Lebanese cable television operator serving the country
Cablevision Industries, an American cable television operator unrelated to New York based Cablevision Systems; acquired in 1995 by Time Warner Cable
Greenwich Cablevision, London community television station, active in the 1970s
Heritage Cablevision, Des Moines, Iowa cable television provider, active 1971–1987
Izzi Telecom, a Mexican cable television operator owned by Grupo Televisa, called Cablevisión until November 2014
Medford Community Cablevision, Inc., Medford, Massachusetts public-access television station
Mountain Cablevision, cable television provider in Hamilton, Ontario
Omineca Cablevision, cable television and internet service provider in Omineca Country, British Columbia
Sheffield Cablevision, Sheffield, England cable television community channel, active 1973–1976
Troy Cablevision, Alabama cable television, cable internet, security systems, and VOIP provider
UA-Columbia Cablevision,  an American cable television provider, active from the 1970s to 1991
Wellingborough Cablevision, Northamptonshire, England cable television broadcaster, active 1974–1975

See also
Cable television